The Vernon Building Society (Poynton) Brass Band is a brass band from Poynton in Cheshire, England. As one of the North-West's premiere brass bands, Vernon Building Society (Poynton) Band is well known for its original and entertaining concert programmes, as well as being a prize-winner at contests throughout the country.

History 
Started within the Poynton coal mining community, the Vernon Building Society (Poynton) Band, as it is now known, was supported by the mine owners, the Vernon family. It is not known for certain when the band began, but records from 1832 stating that new uniforms had been purchased by Lady Vernon suggest that it has existed for well over 160 years.

Since 1988 the band has been proudly bearing the name of its sponsors the Vernon Building Society safeguarding the bands continued existence.

Contesting honours 
2020  
North West Regional Championships (Championship Section) - TBC

2019  
Dr Martin's Wainstones Cup - 2nd place overall and Best March

Spring Festival Senior Trophy - 1st Place 
North West Regional Championships (Championship Section) - 10th Place

2018  
Rochdale Contest (Championship/First) - 2nd Place 
Spring Festival Senior Trophy - 5th Place 
North West Regional Championships (Championship Section) - 4th Place

2017  
North West Regional Championships (Championship Section) - 8th Place

2016  
National Championship Of Great Britain (1st Section) - 2nd Place 
Spring Festival Senior Cup - 12th Place 
North West Regional Championships (1st Section) - 1st Place

2015  
Rochdale Contest (Championship) - 3rd Place 
Spring Festival Senior Trophy - 3rd Place 
North West Regional Championships (Championship) - 13th Place

2014  
Wychavon Entertainment Contest (Championship) - 2nd Place 
Wychavon Entertainment Contest (1st Section) - 1st Place 
Whit Friday - 3rd Prize (Upper Mossley) 
North West Regional Championships (1st Section) - 4th Place 
Butlins Mineworkers Open Brass Band Festival (1st Section) - 2nd Place

2013  
Northern Open Brass Band Championships (Championship) - 2nd Place 
Fleetwood Open Brass Band Championships (Championship) - 3rd Place 
Whit Friday - 7th Overall in Tameside 
Whit Friday - 1st Prize (Duckinfield) 
Buxton Brass Band Festival (Championship Section) - 2nd Place 
North West Regional Championships (1st Section) - 5th Place 
Butlins Mineworkers Open Brass Band Festival (1st Section) - 17th Place

2012  
Buxton Brass Band Festival (Championship/1st) - 3rd Prize  
North West Regional Championships (Championship Section) - 10th Place

2011  
Wychavon Festival of Brass (Championship Section) - 5th Place  
Bolsover Brass Festival (Championship Section) - 7th Place  
North West Regional Championships (Championship Section) - 9th Place

2010  
Whit Friday - 12th Overall in Saddleworth 
North West Regional Championships (1st Section) - 4th Place  
Butlins Mineworkers Championships (1st Section) - 3rd Prize

2009  
Bolsover Brass Festival (1st Section) - 1st Prize  
Wychavon Festival of Brass (1st Section) - 1st Prize  
Buxton Brass Band Festival (Championship/1st) - 2nd Prize  
North West Regional Championships (1st Section) - 7th Place  
Butlins Mineworkers Championships (1st Section) - 3rd Prize

Musical director 
Musical Director - Stig Maersk

Associate Conductor - Jess Tredrea

Composer in residence 
Darrol Barry

Current principal players 

Principal Cornet: TBC

Solo Euphonium: Sam Noden

Soprano Cornet: Emily Williams

Solo Trombone: Toby Marshall

Solo Horn: Jilly Atwell

Flugel Horn: Jess Tredrea

Solo Baritone: Natsumi McDonald

Principal Eb Bass: Tom Barnet

Principal Percussion: David Johnson

Discography

References

External links 
 VBS Poynton Band Official Website
 Grandfather's Clock played by our Euphonium Soloist Andrew Ingleby.
 The Wizard Whit Friday 2014

British instrumental musical groups
British brass bands
People from Poynton